Cistus clusii is a shrubby species of flowering plant in the family Cistaceae, with white flowers, native to south west and south central Europe and north Africa. It has been wrongly called Cistus libanotis by many authors.

Description
The flower stalks (peduncles and pedicels) and the sepals are covered with long white hairs. The style is short.

Taxonomy
Cistus clusii was first described by Michel Félix Dunal in 1824. The specific epithet clusii honours Carolus Clusius. The name Cistus libanotis has been wrongly applied to this species by many authors. A 2011 molecular phylogenetic study placed C. clusii in a clade with Cistus munbyi in the white and whitish pink clade of Cistus species, sister to all the remaining white and whitish pink flowered species.

Phylogeny
Cistus clusii belongs to the white and whitish pink flowered clade of Cistus species.

Distribution
Cistus clusii is native to north Africa and the west and central Mediterranean region: southern Spain, the Balearic Islands, south-east Italy and Sicily.

References

External links

 

clusii
Plants described in 1824